Tonight may refer to:

Television
 Tonight (1957 TV programme), a 1957–1965 British current events television programme hosted by Cliff Michelmore that was broadcast on BBC
 Tonight (1975 TV programme),  a 1975–1979 British current events television programme on BBC One
 Tonight (1999 TV programme), a British news magazine television programme that has aired on ITV since 1999
 Tonight (New Zealand TV programme), a New Zealand evening news programme hosted by Kate Hawkesby
 The Tonight Show, a United States talk show, also known in its early years as simply Tonight
 Tonight with Arnold Clavio, a Philippine television talk show
 "Tonight" (Prison Break), an episode of Prison Break

Music

Bands
 Tonight (band), a British new-wave group

Albums
 Tonight (Clark Terry-Bob Brookmeyer Quintet album), 1965
 Tonight (David Bowie album), or the title song (see below)
 Tonight (FM album), 1987
 Tonight (France Joli album), or the title song
 Tonight (Millionaires album)
 Tonight (Renée Geyer album), 2005
 Tonight (Silk album), or the title song
 Tonight (TobyMac album), or the title song
 Tonight (Big Bang EP), or the title song
 Tonight! (Summercamp EP), 1997
 Tonight: Franz Ferdinand, by Franz Ferdinand
 Tonight, by Ed Jordan

Songs
 "Tonight" (1956 song), from the musical West Side Story
 "Tonight" (Barbara Mandrell song), 1978
 "Tonight" (Big Bang song), 2011
 "Tonight" (The Big Pink song), 2010
 "Tonight" (Blondie song), 2017
 "Tonight" (Danny Byrd song), 2011
 "Tonight" (Def Leppard song), 1993
 "Tonight" (Doja Cat song), 2021
 "Tonight" (Emcee N.I.C.E.), 2014
 "Tonight" (Humanoid song)
 "Tonight" (Iggy Pop song), covered by co-writer David Bowie
 "Tonight" (Jay Sean song), 2008
 "Tonight" (Jett Rebel song)
 "Tonight" (Jeremy Camp song), 2006
 "Tonight" (Jessica Sanchez song), 2013
 "Tonight" (Jonas Brothers song)
 "Tonight" (Kállay Saunders song), 2012
 "Tonight" (Kesha song), 2020
 "Tonight" (Kim Hyun-joong song)
 "Tonight" (Low song)
 "Tonight" (Luna Sea song),  2000
 "Tonight" (The Move song), 1971
 "Tonight" (New Kids on the Block song), 1990
 "Tonight" (Raspberries song), 1973
 "Tonight" (Reamonn song), 2006
 "Tonight" (Rubettes song), from the album Wear It's 'At
 "Tonight" (Rufus song), 2013
 "Tonight" (Sara Evans song), 2004
 "Tonight" (Seether song), 2011
 "Tonight" (Spica song), 2013
 "Tonight" (Sugarland song), 2011
 "Tonight" (TrueBliss song), 1999
 "Tonight" (The Underdog Project song)
 "Tonight" (Westlife song), 2002
 "Tonight (Best You Ever Had)", 2012 by John Legend featuring Ludacris
 "Tonight (Could Be the Night)", by The Velvets
 "Tonight (I'm Lovin' You)", by Enrique Iglesias
 "Tonight (We Live Forever)" by Union J, 2014
 "Tonight" by The Afters, from the album Never Going Back to OK
 "Tonight" by Alex Band, from the album We've All Been There
 "Tonight" by Benny Mardones, from the album A Journey Through Time
 "Tonight" by Blackfoot, from the album After the Reign
 "Tonight" by Drag-On, from the album Oz: The Soundtrack
 "Tonight" by Dommin, from the album Love is Gone
 "Tonight" by Elton John, from the album Blue Moves
 "Tonight" by FM Static, from the album Critically Ashamed
 "Tonight" by Freezepop, from the album Fancy Ultra•Fresh
 "Tonight" by Hard-Fi, from the album Once Upon a Time in the West
 "Tonight" by Inna, from the album Party Never Ends
 "Tonight" by James, a B-side of the single "Sit Down"
 "Tonight" by Joe Cocker, from the album Across from Midnight
 "Tonight" by Keke Palmer and Cham, from the film Night at the Museum
 "Tonight", by Ken Laszlo
 "Tonight" by Kings of Leon, from the album Mechanical Bull
 "Tonight" by Kool & The Gang, from the album In the Heart
 "Tonight" by Kutless, from the album Kutless
 "Tonight" by Matt Brouwer from the album Till the Sunrise
 "Tonight" by MC5, from the album Back in the USA
 "Tonight" by McAlmont & Butler, from the album The Sound of McAlmont and Butler
 "Tonight" by Michael Mazochi, from the TV series The Shield
 "Tonight" by Monni
 "Tonight" by Mötley Crüe, from the album Too Fast for Love
 "Tonight" by NEFFEX
 "Tonight" by Nick Lowe, from the album Jesus of Cool
 "Tonight" by Ozzy Osbourne, from the album Diary of a Madman
 "Tonight" by Paddy Casey, from the album Addicted to Company (Part One)
 "Tonight" by Rapture Ruckus, from the album Rapture Ruckus (EP)
 "Tonight" by Raspberries, from the album Side 3
 "Tonight" by Ringo Starr, from the album Bad Boy
 "Tonight" by The Soft Boys, from the album Underwater Moonlight
 "Tonight" by Staind, from the album 14 Shades of Grey
 "Tonight" by Supergrass, from the album In It for the Money
 "Tonight", by Thomas Newson & Magnificence
 "Tonight" by Tommy Tutone, from the album Tommy Tutone 2
 "Tonight" by TV on the Radio, from the album Return to Cookie Mountain
 "Tonight", by Tyler Joseph
 "Tonight" by Xscape, from the album Hummin' Comin' at 'Cha
 "Tonight" by Yemi Alade, from the album Mama Africa
 "Tonight", by Yuksek
 "Tonight (We Need a Lover)" by Mötley Crüe, from the album Theatre of Pain

Other uses
 Tonight (newspaper), a free afternoon newspaper in Toronto, Canada

See also
 Tonight Tonight (disambiguation)
 "Tonight, Tonight, Tonight", by Genesis
 Tonightly, a British comedy entertainment show
 
 Tonite (disambiguation)